Hideo Sasaki (25 November 1919 – 30 August 2000) was a Japanese American landscape architect.

Biography
Hideo Sasaki was born in Reedley, California, on 25 November 1919. He grew up working on his family's California truck farm, and harvesting crops on Arizona farms. He began his college studies at the University of California, Berkeley during the time of World War II. Owing to his Japanese descent, he was forced into the Poston internment camp in Arizona after the signing of Executive Order 9066. He was able to leave the camp upon volunteering to work as a farm hand in Sterling, Colorado. Soon after the war, he moved to Denver, Colorado where he met his wife, Kisa, a graduate of the University of Colorado. Sasaki then moved to the University of Illinois where he received Bachelor of Fine Arts and Landscape Architecture in 1946. During his time at the University of Illinois at Urbana Champaign, Sasaki worked with a man named Professor Harris. Professor Harris enjoyed working with Hideo and saw the brilliance in his designs and thinking process. According to Professor Harris in an interview with the New York Times, he said "He was calling for the need for more contemporary design and collaboration at a time when landscape architecture was still caught up in the Beaux-Arts, He didn't subscribe to any particular design aesthetic. He wanted people to understand the human needs and natural forces that were working on the landscape." What this means is that Sasaki had thought outside the box and through that was able to move architecture into its modern era. Professor Harris has seen this innovation and passion in Sasaki during his time at the University of Illinois at Urbana Champaign. Sasaki's work at the University of Illinois at Urbana Champaign was influential in shaping modern landscape architecture. He proposed a new design philosophy that focused on understanding the relationships between humans and nature. He encouraged collaboration between disciplines and advocated for the use of modern design techniques. His work helped to shift the way landscape architecture was approached and created a more holistic approach to design. His ideas continue to influence modern landscape architecture today. In 1948 he graduated with a Master of Landscape Architecture from Harvard Design School. After graduation he returned to Illinois where he instructed for two years. For the next eighteen years (1953-1970) he became a professor and the chairman of the department of Landscape Architecture of the Harvard Graduate School of Design. In 1953, he founded Sasaki Associates, incorporated in nearby Watertown, Massachusetts, where he was the president and chairman until 1980. He led the company's architects and planners in developing many noted commercial areas and corporate parks. In 1956 he worked on the design of the Havana Plan Piloto with Mario Romañach and the Catalan architect Josep Lluís Sert.

During his later years he lived with his family (wife and two daughters, Rin and Ann) in Lafayette, California. He died on 30 August 2000 in a hospital in Walnut Creek, California. Sasaki was highly influential in the field of landscape architecture. Hideo Sasaki is a private person and not much is known about his personal life. He is married with two daughters who are both successful in their own right. Sasaki’s hobbies include golf, painting, and music. He is an avid traveler and has toured extensively throughout Japan and the United States. He also enjoys reading and playing the piano. He is also an avid reader and enjoys classical music. Sasaki is known to be an avid collector of Japanese paintings and sculptures. His iconic designs include the open plazas of the John Hancock Tower in Boston, the Boston City Hall Plaza, the Harvard Graduate School of Business and the United Nations Plaza in San Francisco. He is recognized for his influential research on landscape ecology, urban design, and park planning. He was an advocate for the integration of architecture, engineering, and ecology in the urban environment, and his work is credited with helping to create the modern urban landscape. Sasaki was awarded the ASLA Medal, the highest honor accorded to a landscape architect, in 1987. Sasaki was a leader in the development of the field of landscape architecture and contributed significantly to the development of the profession. He wrote or co-authored numerous books and articles on landscape design, urban design, and ecology, and he was instrumental in the creation of the Landscape Architecture Foundation. He was an active member of the American Society of Landscape Architects (ASLA) and was a founding member of the International Federation of Landscape Architects.

Architectural Experience 
Hideo Sasaki was a man who cared much about integrating his Japanese culture into his architectural work. Over the years he had partnered with Peter Walker to create Sasaki Walker and Associates. After creating the firm, Sasaki was able to expand his company into having offices in Sanfranciso, Nashville, Baltimore, Denver, Washington DC and even Canada. According to Oxford Reference [10], " Among the firm's works of landscape design may be cited the Golden Gateway Center, San Francisco (1959–60—with Skidmore, Owings, & Merrill); Foothill College, Los Altos, CA (1960–2); Weyerhaeuser Headquarters, Tacoma, WA (1963–72); the roof-gardens, etc., Bona-ventura Hotel, Montréal, Canada (1964–8— designed by Masao Kinoshita as part of a huge development, the architecture of which was designed by Affleck); Greenacre Park NYC (1970–2); Constitution Plaza, Hartford, CT (1969–73); and the John Deere & Co. headquarters, Moline, IL (1957–63—with buildings by Saarinen)." The Firm has had great success in creating multiple architectural masterpieces with over 50 major buildings. The Cultural Landscape Foundation [11] described Sasakis Firm as, "The firm evolved through various configurations, but consistent was Sasaki’s conviction in the notion of oasis and that landscapes can restore the human spirit."  He is credited with introducing the modernist design principles of minimalism and abstraction to landscape architecture. He was instrumental in developing the “Sasaki Style” which emphasized the integration of natural and man-made elements, the use of simple materials, and the integration of landscape, architecture, and urbanism. He was the first landscape architect to receive the American Society of Landscape Architects’ Medal of Excellence, in 1972. Some of Sasaki’s most notable works include the Benjamin Franklin Parkway in Philadelphia, the San Francisco State College campus, the First National Bank Plaza in Minneapolis, and the National Mall in Washington, DC. Sasaki's works were known for their calming yet modern presence. He was known for creating a "human scale" feeling in his designs. He believed that by creating spaces that people felt comfortable and included in, he could create a more calming atmosphere. He strived to create harmony between the environment and the people who occupied the space. Through his works, he was able to create a style that was unique to him and his cultural background.  Sasaki was a leader in the architectural world and is remembered as a man who was not only able to integrate his culture into his designs, but also as a man who could bring harmony to the environment. He believed in the idea of oasis and that the environment can restore the human spirit. His works have been remembered by many and have impacted the architectural world in many ways. Sasaki died in 2000 and is remembered as one of the most influential architects of his time. He left behind a legacy of architecture that is still studied and admired today. His commitment to creating landscapes and buildings that were calming and inviting, as well as his commitment to integrating his Japanese culture into his designs, have left an important mark on the architectural world. He was an innovator and a leader who will continue to inspire and influence future generations of architects.

Style of design
Sasaki helped to modernize the concepts of Landscape Architecture. He created a practical approach to designing a landscape. In his works, several characteristics are taken into account, such as the historical, cultural, environmental, and social use of the land. Sasaki became famous for developing this concept of interdisciplinary planning. In all of the sites that he developed, a balance is implemented into the design. Sasaki also developed the concept of "Borrowed Scenery" which is the idea of incorporating elements from the surrounding scenery into the design of a site. This was a revolutionary idea for landscape design at the time. Sasaki used this concept to help create a harmony between the natural and the built environment. In addition to this, Sasaki was also instrumental in the development of the ecological approach to landscape architecture. He believed that by incorporating natural elements into the design of a landscape, it would create a more sustainable environment that can be enjoyed by people and wildlife alike. Overall, Sasaki's contributions to Landscape Architecture have helped to influence the way in which we design and interact with our environment today. He developed a practical approach to landscape design that has been used in projects around the world. His work has set the foundation for modern landscape architecture and has allowed for an increased appreciation for the environment. According to The Cultural Landscape Foundation web site [11] "Both in his academic career and in private practice, Sasaki valued cross-disciplinary collaboration, promoting a comprehensive and cooperative approach to planning and design." One aspect that Sasaki Associates pays particular attention to is the environmental aspect of the land. They have taken part in creating several "green designs." These designs are created to enhance or maintain the health of the environment. Some prominent examples can be viewed at the Utah State University Innovation Campus, The Virginia Biosphere, Walden Woods, and the Manulife Financial U.S. Operations Headquarters. Another facet of Sasaki's approach was the modernism that he worked into his college campus projects. He was a pioneer of modernism and he used this style in many of his works. One example of this is the University of Pennsylvania campus, which was designed in the early 1960s. The campus is designed based on the idea of a "garden city" with tree-lined pathways and a central plaza. His works also featured the use of modern materials such as concrete, steel, and glass. These materials were used to create a sleek, modern look to the projects.  Sasaki's ideas are still highly relevant today. His approach to designing landscapes has been embraced by many professionals and is used to create aesthetically pleasing landscapes that are both sustainable and environmentally friendly. His design principles are seen in many of the world's most prestigious landscapes and campuses. His works provide an example of how modern and contemporary design can be used to create beautiful and functional landscapes. Sasaki is best known for his work in architecture and urban design. He is credited with transforming the traditional Japanese garden into the modern look that we now associate with it. He also designed several iconic buildings, including the St. Louis Arch, the United Nations Building in New York City, and the John F. Kennedy Library in Boston. His style was known for its integration of modern design and traditional Japanese aesthetics. He also wrote several books on architecture and urban planning. Sasaki was awarded the Pritzker Prize in 1985 and was awarded the AIA Gold Medal in 1992. He also received the Japanese Medal of Honor in 1997. He was inducted into the National Academy of Design in 2000. In 2009, he was honored with the American Institute of Architects Gold Medal. Sasaki was a passionate advocate for urban sustainability and green design. He was an early proponent of green roofs, the use of green space in cities, and the integration of nature and the built environment. He was an active member of the U.S. Green Building Council and was involved in the development of the Leadership in Energy and Environmental Design (LEED) rating system. Sasaki's work has been featured in numerous publications and exhibits, including a solo exhibition at the Centre Pompidou in Paris in 1996. His work has also been featured in the Museum of Modern Art in New York and the National Building Museum in Washington, D.C.

Major projects

Sasaki's firm operated under his own name, as Sasaki Associates, as Sasaki, Walker & Associates (with landscape architect Peter Walker), as Sasaki, Strong & Associates in Toronto (with landscape architect Richard Strong) and as Sasaki, Dawson, DeMay Associates, Inc..

 Foothill College, Los Altos Hills, California, 1957
master plan for Goucher College, Towson, Maryland, 1957 
 Washington Square Village, Greenwich Village, New York City, 1958
 master plan for Sea Pines Resort, Hilton Head, South Carolina, circa 1961
 Bell Labs Holmdel Complex, Holmdel Township, New Jersey, 1962
 consultant for York University, Toronto, 1962
 master plan for University of Massachusetts Amherst, Amherst, Massachusetts, 1962
 John Deere World Headquarters, Moline, Illinois, 1964
 One Maritime Plaza, San Francisco, California, 1964
master plan for the Loomis Chaffee School, Windsor, Connecticut, 1967
 One Shell Plaza, Houston, Texas, 1971
 urban design for Pearl Street Mall, Boulder, Colorado, 1977
 Forrestal Village, Princeton, New Jersey, 1986
 Waterfront Park, Charleston, South Carolina, 1990
Euro Disneyland in Paris, France, 1992
 master plan for The Arboretum at Penn State, State College, Pennsylvania, 1999
 Performance Hall, Utah State University, Logan, Utah, 2006
 master plan for the Puerto Rico Convention Center District, 2006
 redesign and reconstruction of the Ithaca Commons, 2015

Awards and achievements
In 1961 President John F. Kennedy appointed Sasaki to the U.S. Commission of Fine Arts. He held this position until 1971, being re-appointed by President Lyndon B. Johnson in 1965.
In 1971 he received the American Society of Landscape Architects Medal, the first person to do so.
In 1973 he received the Allied Professions Medal from the American Institute of Architects.
Sasaki was member of CU-Boulder's four-member design review board for 33 years.
He was Chairman of the department of landscape architecture at the Harvard Graduate School of Design (1950-1968).
He founded Sasaki Associates Inc. and was chairman and president of the board (1953-1980).
He was a Juror for the Vietnam Memorial Competition in 1981, the Astronaut Memorial Competition in 1988 and the Peace Garden Competition in 1989.
Sasaki was awarded the Centennial Medal for his impact on landscape architecture at the Harvard Design School, at a 1999 symposium on his work.
In 1984 Sasaki was awarded an honorary doctorate from the University of Colorado at Boulder.

References

Sources References 
[9]The first source I used was from the Oxford Reference(published after Hideo's death) and was titled "Hideo Sasaki." This source goes into great detail about the career of the late Hideo Sasaki in a very brief manner by discussing his major landscaping masterpieces. This source aligns with the Wikipedia guidelines for reliable sources as the source was published and reviewed by the Oxford Reference. The source is also a biography of a living persons accomplishments which also meets the requirements for wikipedia. The only additional information needed is the date that the biography was published and the name of the person who published the biography. 

[10]The second source used was from the Cultural Landscape Foundation and titled "Hideo Sasaki" by Melanie Simo. The source goes into detail about Sasakis' early life at the University of Illinois at Urbana Champaign, to his later years working as an architect. It also talks about how Sasaki created his landscapes and the ideas he had. The article meets all wikipedia guidelines as it is an unbiased source from an accredited institution that valued and keeps a glossary of Sasakis work. The only additional information needed is the date in which the article was published. 

[11]The third source used was from the New York Times titled "Hideo Sasaki, 80, Influential Landscape Architect, Dies" by Anne Raver on September 25, 2000. The source talks about Sasaki's death and the reasons behind why the works of Sasakis' was so inspirational. Although all the source is from a news organization, there is no reason to believe that the source is unreliable. The source is a biography which is meant to layout historical facts about Sasaki. Also, the article lists out quotes to ensure there is no faulty evidence. Other than the fact that the source is from a news organization, it meets all of Wikipedias requirements. 

[12]The last source I used was from the PCAD washington library and titled "Hideo Sasaki." There is no date from the source but it is published after Hideos' death. The source provides links to various works of Sasakis' and also shows all the buildings Sasaki worked on as well. The source also gives all the publications in Hideo's name. The source meets the requirements of Wikipedia as it is a .edu source, however the source needs a date and author.

External links

Sasaki Associates

American landscape architects
Architects from California
1919 births
2000 deaths
California people in design
American people of Japanese descent
Japanese-American internees
UC Berkeley College of Environmental Design alumni
Harvard Graduate School of Design alumni
University of Colorado alumni
People from Reedley, California
People from Alameda County, California
20th-century American architects